Elizabeth Webb  may refer to:

Lizzie Webb, British exercise TV presenter
Beth Webb, British children's author
Betty Webb, American journalist and author of detective books
Liz Webb, character in Teachers (UK TV series)